George Robert Edwards (1 April 1918 – 21 January 1993) was an English professional footballer who is best known for his career with Aston Villa. His playing position was a striker.

Born in Great Yarmouth, Edwards played for Norwich City before signing for Aston Villa.

Edwards played 122 games for Villa during World War II, scoring 93 goals, and was part of the team that won the Football League War Cup in 1944. He also made wartime guest appearances for Birmingham, Chelmsford, Coventry City, Northampton Town, Norwich City, Walsall, Wrexham, Nottingham Forest, Notts County, West Bromwich Albion, Leicester City and Worcester City.

He later moved to Bilston United before retiring from the game.

References

1918 births
1993 deaths
Sportspeople from Great Yarmouth
English footballers
Association football forwards
Aston Villa F.C. players
Norwich City F.C. players
Birmingham City F.C. wartime guest players
Coventry City F.C. wartime guest players
Northampton Town F.C. wartime guest players
Norwich City F.C. wartime guest players
Walsall F.C. wartime guest players
Wrexham F.C. wartime guest players
Nottingham Forest F.C. wartime guest players
Notts County F.C. wartime guest players
West Bromwich Albion F.C. wartime guest players
Leicester City F.C. wartime guest players